David Simpkins may refer to:

 David Simpkins (cricketer, born 1934), former English cricketer
 David Simpkins (cricketer, born 1962), former English cricketer